Bertrand James Waterhouse OBE, FRAIA, FRIBA (8 February 1876 – 2 December 1965) was an English-born Australian architect and artist.

Early life
B. J. Waterhouse, as he was commonly known, was born in Leeds, Yorkshire, England, and was the son of James Waterhouse, a grocer, and his wife Sarah, née Turner. Waterhouse reached Sydney from the Gulf of Mexico with his mother and two sisters in March 1885 and was educated in Burwood. He studied architecture at Sydney Technical College while articled to John Spencer and on 6 July 1898 married 19-year-old Lilian Woodcock (d.1955) at Christ Church St Laurence. Joining the professional relieving staff of the Department of Public Works in NSW in March 1900, he worked in the Harbours and Rivers branch and became a relieving architectural draftsman.

Architect
He was in partnership with J. W. H. Lake from 1908. Waterhouse built up a substantial practice, particularly in the Cremorne-Neutral Bay area. Until the mid-1920s his domestic architecture drew on the Arts and Crafts Movement, with steeply gabled roofs, extensive use of sandstone in the basements, shingle tiles and roughcast exterior wall surfaces. Thereafter his style showed a strong Mediterranean influence, a notable example being May Gibbs's house, Nutcote, with textured stucco walls and symmetrical, twelve-paned, shuttered windows. Waterhouse had a gift for composing shapes, textures, solids and voids into seemingly casual, informal architecture; he was particularly aware of the needs to build in scale and sympathy with people. Thus his houses have a comfortable and warm character, without fuss or strain, free of unnecessary detail. Waterhouse in his early architecture followed the precepts of the English Arts and Crafts movement and his work has a close affinity to that of Charles Voysey, Baillie Scott and Charles Rennie Mackintosh. A typical Waterhouse residence featured asymmetrical, picturesque massing, strongly expressed roofs, usually with dominant gables; porches, balconies and verandahs; and at least one facetted oriel or bay external wall finish, together with areas of timber shingling or tile-hanging. Inside, the main rooms displayed timber wainscoting on the walls and heavy timber beams below the ceilings. He continued to design in this manner until the early 1920s. In his later years Waterhouse designed residences in the Spanish Mission Style.

Artist
An excellent pencil draughtsman, Waterhouse exhibited drawings at annual exhibitions of the (Royal) Art Society of New South Wales from 1902. He travelled through Europe in 1926 with Lionel Lindsay and Will Ashton, and in 1932 exhibited his drawings at the Macquarie Galleries, Sydney. A trustee of the National Art Gallery of New South Wales from 1922, Waterhouse was president in 1939–58; he was also State president of the Society of Arts and Crafts. Twenty one pencil drawings by B.J. Waterhouse are held in the collection at the Art Gallery of NSW.

Employment
 New South Wales Government Architect's Office (1900–08)
 Waterhouse and Lake (1908–1924)
 Worked in association with Leslie Wilkinson
 Director, and later chairman, National Capital Planning and Development Committee (1938–58)

Notable works

 Ailsa, 33 Shellcove Road, Neutral Bay (1908)
 Holme Building – University of Sydney (The), Science Road, University of Sydney (1910–1912)
 St Anne's, 37 Shellcove Road, Neutral Bay, NSW (1912)
 Rowerdennan House, built for Beresford Grant in Warrawee Avenue, Warrawee. (1913)
 Tulkiyan, 707 Pacific Highway, gordon (1913)
 Brent Knowle, 31 Shellcove Road, Neutral Bay (1914)
 St. Ange/St. Agnes, 13 Shellcove Road, Neutral Bay (1917)
 The Gables, 16 Spruson Street Cremorne (1920)
 Somerset, The Boulevarde Strathfield, New South Wales (1923) now part of Trinity Grammar School Preparatory School
 Silvermere and the Chauffeur's Cottage, 38 Blaxland Road, Wentworth Falls, NSW 2782 (1923)
 Refectory Building, Science Road, University of Sydney (1924)
 Nutcote, May Gibbs's House, 5 Wallaringa Avenue Kurraba Point (previously classified as Neutral Bay) (1925)

Listed buildings
(Either designed by B J Waterhouse himself, or by Waterhouse & Lake Partnership, or as Government Architect)
 Bundabulla, 10 Guthrie Avenue, Cremorne, North Sydney, NSW	
 Bundarra – House and Grounds, 7 Bundarra Road, Bellevue Hill, Woollahra, NSW
 House, 64 Dalton Road, Mosman, NSW	
 House, 35 (now 33A) Bangalla Street, Warrawee, Ku-ring-gai, NSW	
 House, 6 Claude Avenue, Cremorne, North Sydney, NSW	
 House, 8 Claude Avenue, Cremorne, North Sydney, NSW
 House, 14 Cremorne Road, Cremorne, North Sydney, NSW
 House, 35 Milson Road, Cremorne, North Sydney, NSW
 House	13 Shellcove Road, Neutral Bay, North Sydney, NSW
 House	29 Bogota Avenue, Cremorne, North Sydney, NSW
 Kew Place, House, 10 Buena Vista Avenue, Mosman, NSW
 Manning Building – University of Sydney (The), Manning Road, University of Sydney (The), Sydney
 Mowll Memorial Village: Lober House, 284 Castle Hill Road, Castle Hill, Hornsby, NSW
 Mowll Memorial Village: Tower House, 284 Castle Hill Road, Castle Hill, Hornsby, NSW
 Murong – House and Grounds, 633 New South Head Road, Rose Bay, Woollahra, NSW
 Pair of houses, Airlie (No. 12), 12 and 14 Buena Vista Avenue, Mosman, NSW
 Shellcove Road Group, Neutral Bay, North Sydney, NSW
 St. Claire – House, 25–27 Cranbrook Road, Bellevue Hill, Woollahra, NSW
 House, 43 Robertson Road, Centennial Park, Sydney
 Werribree – House, Gardens, Retaining Walls, Fences, Covered Gateways, Trees:	37 New South Head Road, Vaucluse, Woollahra, NSW
 Yeomerry – Building, 1 St. Marks Road (188 New South Head Road), Darling Point, Woollahra, NSW

See also

 Australian architectural styles
 New South Wales Government Architect
 Arts and Crafts Movement

References

External links
 Architect BJ Waterhouse
 From Nutcote to Elwatan : the art and architecture of B.J. Waterhouse. Mosman, NSW : Mosman Art Gallery,24 pages
 Bertrand J. Waterhouse OBE, FRIBA, LFRAIA Portrait by William Dargie Art Gallery of NSW
 "ELLERSLIE" Circa 1922-Architect Designed By B.J Waterhouse
 Retrospective Exhibition: From Nutcote to Elwatan: The Art & Architecture of B.J. Waterhouse
 Manning House former Women's Union (includes images)

1965 deaths
English emigrants to Australia
New South Wales architects
Arts and Crafts architects
Federation architects
1876 births
Directors and Presidents of the Art Gallery of New South Wales
Fellows of the Royal Institute of British Architects
Australian Officers of the Order of the British Empire